Celebrity Big Brother 1, also referred to as Celebrity Big Brother 2001, was the first series of the British reality television show Celebrity Big Brother. The show is based on an originally Dutch TV series of the same name created by producer John de Mol in 1997. In honour of Comic Relief, six celebrities entered the Big Brother house.

The series premiered on 9 March 2001, and lasted for a total of eight days. It concluded on 16 March 2001 when comedian Jack Dee was crowned the winner. The series revolved around a group of celebrities living in a custom built house with no contact with the outside world. Each week, the housemates are required to nominate two people for eviction. The two or more people with the most votes were nominated to leave the House. The viewers then decided which of the nominees should leave, with the selected person leaving during a live show. This process continued until only three housemates remained, at which time the public voted for which of them should win the series. Unlike the original show, Celebrity Big Brother saw the housemates competing for charity.

On 17 March 2023, a special twenty-second anniversary show aired as part of the 2023 Comic Relief event. The show titled “When Comic Relief did Big Brother” was broadcast at 10pm on BBC Two. It featured interviews with five of the six housemates (Chris Eubank did not participate) with a look back on the series and their time in the house. Marcus Bentley narrated the episode.

Production

Broadcasts
The series premiered on 9 March 2001, on Channel 4. The contestants were recorded 24 hours a day with cameras fixed around the house, and had to wear portable microphones. Due to the tie-in with Comic Relief, the first series was partly broadcast on BBC One in the week leading up to the telethon. Channel 4 broadcast a daily 30-minute highlights show, and from the second day on there was a live eviction show hosted by Davina McCall, where the evicted housemate was interviewed. In the nightly highlight episodes, viewers are shown various highlights of a specific day in the house. BBC One's coverage consisted of a behind-the-scenes launch show hosted by McCall and 10-minute-long updates each day. Due to the length of the series, the psychologists featured in the main series did not return for Celebrity Big Brother 1, but did continue to appear in the main series. The series ended on 16 March (Red Nose Day) and the finale was broadcast live on both Channel 4 and BBC One as part of the evenings Comic Relief telethon. In total, the series lasted for a total of 8 days. Initially, Celebrity Big Brother was meant to be a one-time series, but due to the success it was later brought back as an annual event, airing while the main series was completed. Celebrity Big Brother 1 was the first season in the UK edition of Big Brother to feature a live premiere, something that would be used from Big Brother 3 onward.

Prizes
The six celebrities in the game are competing for charity, rather than a grand prize for themselves. While in the house, the housemates attempted to complete various tasks assigned by Big Brother in exchange for a grocery budget, which they used to buy food and luxuries; this included buying things such as alcohol and cigarettes. Celebrity Big Brother 1, much like the main series, did not feature luxury competitions or prizes throughout the season.

House
For the first season, Celebrity Big Brother used the house that was used in Big Brother 1, which was located in Bow, London near the 3 Mills Studios. The House remained relatively unchanged from its appearance in the debut season. A living room was featured in the house, with blue walls lining it and the kitchen, which featured a stove and sink, along with the fridge. The house featured two nearly identical bedrooms, one for the men and one for the women. Each room featured five beds, with matching sheets and furniture. There was a shower room and toilet in the house as well. Housemates could communicate with producers in the room known was the "Diary Room". The Diary Room for the first season featured a simple design, being a small chair with a white background. Future seasons of the series would feature more elaborate Diary Rooms. The Diary Room was where nominations took place, and where housemates could reveal their thoughts. As seen in the third week, housemates could be seen by a medical professional in the Diary Room if necessary. The outside of the house featured a chicken coop with various chickens inside, from which the housemates collect eggs. Unlike other editions of the show, Big Brother 1 did not feature a swimming pool or hot tub for the housemates to use. There was also a garden in the backyard, which featured a vegetable patch which the housemates could use. Various two way mirrors are in the house, with a camera crew behind them. There are also various cameras and microphones throughout the house, providing the housemates with no privacy.

Format
Big Brother is a game show in which a group of contestants, called housemates, live in isolation from the outside world in a custom built "house", which includes everyday facilities such as a fully equipped kitchen, garden, two bedrooms, and a bathroom. The house is also a television studio with cameras and microphones in most of the rooms to record the activities of the housemates. The only place where housemates can escape the company of the other contestants is the Diary Room, where they are encouraged to voice their true feelings. Not all Diary Room footage is broadcast due to the privacy of the contestants. Each week all housemates nominate two of their fellow contestants for potential eviction. Failure to do so may result in a punishment, such as a reduction in the prize fund. The two, or more, housemates with the highest number of nominations face a public vote conducted by phone, with the contestant receiving the most votes being evicted from the house. The last contestant remaining in the house is declared the winner and will earn money for a charity. Big Brother host Davina McCall returned for Celebrity Big Brother to host the live premiere and eviction episodes. The eviction episodes remain largely unchanged from that of the main series.

Over the duration of the series, the Housemates are given a series of tasks by Big Brother which test them in many ways. They are also put to the test by their own ideals, prejudices and opinions against other people from different walks of life; something that has survived from the original "social experiment" of Big Brother 1. They live in the communal House and share cooking and cleaning chores among themselves, which usually provides plenty of tension. Housemates are forbidden to sleep during daylight hours (unless unwell) - Big Brother plays the wake-up call persistently in the morning if housemates do not wake up and will play an alarm clock noise into the house if a housemate falls asleep during the day. Housemates must also live by the fundamental rules of Big Brother; if the rules are broken it can result in formal warnings, various punishments or even a housemate's removal from the House. They must wash their own clothes by hand, and they have to make their own bread from scratch. Each week Big Brother sets the Housemates a task in order to determine the shopping budget for the following week. They must work together to win the tasks in order to win a luxury shopping budget which changed based on the number of people remaining in the house. If all food runs out in the House, Big Brother provides emergency rations of chickpeas and rice. Housemates are responsible for their own shopping and decide which items the budget will allow them to have. Only a small percentage of the overall budget can be spent on alcohol.

Housemates

Weekly summary

Nominations table

Notes
: The public were voting for the Housemate they wanted to win rather than to evict.

Viewership
These viewing figures are taken from BARB.

References

2001 British television seasons
01
Comic Relief